Western Hills Mall is a shopping mall in metro Birmingham, Alabama. 

The mall opened in 1969 as the second in Birmingham, under the development of Aronov Realty. Loveman's of Alabama, which became Pizitz in 1980, was one of its original anchor stores. Pizitz later became McRae's, then Parisian. JCPenney was the other major store, with Yeilding's and F.W. Woolworth Company as the other major tenants. The Yeilding's space was later occupied by Goody's Family Clothing.

In 2006, Western Hills Mall underwent a major transformation. The JCPenney location was demolished, with the mall building being truncated at the former Penney entrance. A new Walmart Supercenter was built on the site of the former JCPenney. Parisian also closed in the late 2000s and a Burlington Coat Factory took its place.

In January 2016, Walmart Supercenter closed its doors. In February 2017, Burlington Coat Factory also went out of business from the mall.

On February 16, 2018, a shootout occurred at the mall. Anthony Alberigi, the manager of the mall, was killed in the gunfire.

References

External links
Official website

Shopping malls in the Birmingham, Alabama metro area
Buildings and structures in Birmingham, Alabama
Shopping malls established in 1969